Asan is a city in South Chungcheong Province, South Korea. It borders the Seoul Capital Area to the north. Asan has a population of approximately 300,000.

Asan is known for its many hot springs and is a city of spas.

Asan has grown into the neighboring village, Onyang-dong, which is also known for its hot springs.

Climate
Asan has a humid continental climate (Köppen: Dwa), but can be considered a borderline humid subtropical climate (Köppen: Cwa) using the  isotherm.

Transportation
The city of Asan shares a station for the KTX high speed trains with the directly adjacent city of Cheonan, which is thusly named Cheonan-Asan Station. It takes about 30 minutes to travel from Asan to Seoul by the KTX train. It can be reached within 2 hours from Incheon International Airport by car. Seoul Metropolitan Subway extended one of its lines to service Asan on 15 December 2008. Two major highways, the Seoul-Busan and West Coast expressways, also pass through Asan city.

Industry and commerce
Companies like Hyundai Motor, Samsung LCD, and Samsung Electronic have factories in Asan. A total of 14 industrial complexes are currently occupied by auto parts, electronic parts and other factories.

The Port of Pyeongtaek, closest to the east China coast among Korean ports, is nearby.

Place worth visiting 
Blue Crystal Village: The Mediterranean village is located in Tangjeong-myeon, Asan-si, Chungcheongnam-do. This place, which was first a vineyard, was created as a new village with the construction of an industrial complex. The white walls and blue roofs of Santorini, Greece, are intact, and create exotic landscapes based on the architectural style of European architecture.

Education
Asan is the home of five universities.
 Hoseo University
 Asan Information and Technology Polytechnic College
 Seonam University
 Soonchunhyang University
 Sun Moon University

Domestic secondary schools:
 Onyang High School

International schools:
 Onyang Chinese Elementary School (溫陽華僑小學校/온양화교소학교)

Sport

Asan is home of Asan Woori Bank WooriWON, a women's basketball team. In 2016, the club was relocated from Chuncheon to Asan. The K League 2 football club Asan Mugunghwa FC was based in the city from 2017 to 2019. Asan Mugunghwa FC was dissolved after the 2019 season. After the dissolution of Asan Mugunghwa FC, Chungnam Asan FC became the city's professional football club, and plays in the K League 2.

Modern history
 In 1983, an alteration of townships (ri) and towns (myeon) was made.
 In 1986, Onyang eup (town) of Asan was separated and the independent city of Onyang was created.
 In 1995, the City of Onyang and Asan County were combined into the City of Asan.

Notable people
People born in Asan include:
An Gyeong-ja (born 1950), volleyball player
An Hye-jin (1998), volleyball player
Bok Geo-il (born 1946), novelist and poet
Seung-Hui Cho (1984-2007), mass murderer; perpetrator of the Virginia Tech shooting
Queen Inseon (1619-1674), queen consort
Jang Dong-min (born 1979), comedian
Da Un Jung (born 1993), mixed martial artist
Lee O-young (1934-2022), critic and novelist
Lee So-young (born 1994), volleyball player
Lee Young-ja (born 1967), comedian and television presenter
Jhoon Rhee (1932-2018), taekwondo master
Ri Ki-yong (1896-1984), novelist
Ryoo Seung-bum (born 1980), actor
Shin Su-jong (born 1988), swimmer
Yun Chi-ho (1864-1945), political activist
Yun Chi-sung (1875-1936), imperial general and politician; cousin of Chi-ho
Yun Chi-oh (1869-1950), educator and politician; brother of Chi-ho
Yun Yeong-ryeol (1854–1939), politician and soldier

Twin towns – sister cities
 Petaling Jaya, Malaysia
 Lansing, United States

See also
 List of cities in South Korea

References

External links

 City government website

 

 
Cities in South Chungcheong Province